Coercive logic is a concept popularised by mathematician Raymond Smullyan, by which a person who has agreed to answer a question truthfully is forced to perform an undesired action, where not doing so would mean breaking their agreement. Smullyan presents the concept as a question:

Smullyan's question is asking the reader whether at least one of the two options is true:
They will truthfully answer no to his question.
They will pay him two million dollars. 

The reader is unable to truthfully give an answer of no, as doing so would be to assert that both of the statements were false ("no, my answer is not no" and "no, I will not pay you two million dollars"). The first of these is a self-contradictory statement.

If the reader answers yes, they cannot be saying that "will truthfully answer no" is true (as they did not answer no), so must be asserting that "will pay two million dollars" is true. Therefore, they must give Smullyan two million dollars.

Smullyan credits the name of the process to his son-in-law Jack Kotik.

References

Logic puzzles